Mangelia luellingensis is an extinct species of sea snail, a marine gastropod mollusk in the family Mangeliidae.

Description
The length of the shell attains 4.5 mm, its diameter 1.9 mm.

Distribution
This extinct marine species was found in Miocene strata of Germany; age range: 15.97 to 11.608 Ma

References

 G. Wienrich and R. Janssen. 2007. Die Fauna des marinen Miozäns von Kevelaer (Niederrhein). Band 4 Gastropoda ab Mitridae. Backhuys Publishers BV Leiden 4:643-954

External links
 Worldwide Mollusc Species Data Base: Mangelia luellingensis 

luellingensis
Gastropods described in 2007